Janelle Bailey (born May 4, 1999) is an American women's basketball player. In 2016, she won a bronze medal as the starting center on Team USA at the FIBA Under-17 World Championship for Women. After playing at the University of North Carolina, Bailey went undrafted in the 2021 WNBA draft. On April 24, 2021, she signed a rookie-scale contract with the New York Liberty. However, a week prior to the start of the regular season, Bailey was waived by the team.

High school
Bailey won three state titles and scored more than 1,000 points while attending Providence Day School in Charlotte. In 2017, she was named a McDonald's All-American and USA Basketball Female Athlete of the Year.

Personal
Bailey was born in New York City to Hessard and Kim Bailey. Hessard was born in Jamaica and had experience as an amateur boxer and Kim ran track in high school. At the age of 2, the family moved to Charlotte, North Carolina.

References 

1999 births
Living people
American women's basketball players
Basketball players from Charlotte, North Carolina
North Carolina Tar Heels women's basketball players